Greater Union Organisation Pty Ltd, trading as Event Cinemas, Greater Union, GU Film House, Moonlight Cinema and Birch Carroll & Coyle (BCC Cinemas), is the largest movie exhibitor in Australia and New Zealand, with over 140 cinema complexes currently operating worldwide.

The Greater Union Organisation is a subsidiary of the ASX-listed Event Hospitality and Entertainment, a corporation that owns and operates brands in the entertainment, hospitality and leisure sectors, mainly within Australasia.

History

The Event Cinemas cinema chain has had a great impact on the Australian culture and  film industry, and has a history of mergers and acquisitions and liquidations that span over a century.

Early 20th century
From 1906 to 1911, during the silent era, Australia was the most prolific producer of feature films in the world, a period which included the creation of the first feature-length film The Kelly Gang. This creative and fertile period in Australian film history was largely created by competition between West's Pictures, Spencer's Pictures and Amalgamated Pictures. On 4 May 1912 the three joined to form The General Film Company of Australasia. On 4 January 1913 it then merged with The Greater J.D. Williams Amusement Co and restructured to become The Combine, a famous partnership between exhibition wing Union Theatres and the production and distribution wing Australasian Films.

The Combine monopoly was highly influential on the early twentieth-century Australian film industry. However, it came under heavy criticism for its low interest in producing Australian films, its preference for imported cinema, and its reluctance to exhibit Australian films by other producers. Film icon and director Raymond Longford, whose independent production company had come under attack by the group, said in 1927 that "had it not been for the activities of that firm in its endeavour to crush it in its infancy, the local picture would now be 10 years at least advanced to the height now attained by the Americans." Historians have traced the sharp decline of the Australian film industry in 1913 to the repercussions of these series of takeovers and mergers. James Sabine has said that "the stranglehold of The Combine forced a decline in local production and contributed to many Australian production companies closing their doors."

The Combine continued to grow into the 1920s during the genesis of the Hollywood era with its focus on exhibiting American films. The Great Depression saw Union Theatres being liquidated in 1931 and its assets purchased by newly formed Greater Union Theatres. This new company split from Australasian Films, established the Hollywood-model subsidiary Cinesound Productions, expanded into radio and newspaper, and kept its major focus on building and managing cinemas. Due to The Depression, Greater Union Theatres merged into the General Film Corporation with Hoyts, a competitor who had secured Fox Film as a shareholder. In 1937 Norman Rydge became managing director and removed the company from the previous merger.

1945–: post-war expansion
In 1945, the last year of World War II, there was a box office boom and the British Rank Organisation purchased a half share in Greater Union Theatres. During this time Greater Union acquired the rights of ownership of many theatres across the country including what became the Phoenician Club in Broadway, Sydney in 1943, originally owned by McIntyre's Broadway Theatres and established as a cinema in 1911. It acquired the Clifford Theatre Circuit in Adelaide in March 1947. The purchase price of £300,000 for the 22 suburban and regional cinemas was "believed to be the largest motion picture transaction ever made in Australia". The Clifford name was retained as a tribute to the entrepreneur Dan Clifford, and South Australian staff were retained.

In 1958 the four holding companies in the Greater Union Theatres group were merged into the Rydge family Amalgamated Holdings Limited (AHL), and in 1965 Greater Union Theatres was renamed the Greater Union Organisation (GUO). In 1980 billionaire Alan Rydge was appointed Chairman of AHL to become the youngest chairman of an Australian public company.

In 1975 Greater union bought the old Metro Theatre in Hindley Street, Adelaide, and redeveloped it as a modern four-screen cinema complex, called Hindley Cinemas 1–4. In October 1980 the company bought the building that had once housed the first cinema in Adelaide, West's Olympia, also in Hindley Street, reopening a rebuilt complex in December 1982 as Hindley Cinemas 5–6.

In 1984 AHL regained control over the now-defunct Rank Organisation's half share, meaning that it once again became fully Australian-owned. In 1987 GUO merged with Village Roadshow to form the distribution company Roadshow Film Distributors, and by that time, GUO and Village Roadshow partnered on a $100 million cinema chain that will see 200 circuits expanded by use by 1990.

In 1991 GUO acquired Birch, Carroll & Coyle. In the same year, Hindley Cinemas 1–4 and  5–6 closed.

21st century
In 2003 AHL and Village Roadshow combined to form Australian Theatres.

Since 2009 a number of cinemas have been renamed from Greater Union Cinemas to Event Cinemas. On 22 December 2015 AHL was renamed Event Hospitality and Entertainment.

In 2019, Birch Carroll & Coyle was inducted into the Queensland Business Leaders Hall of Fame in recognition of being Australia's leading provincial film distributor and its industry leadership throughout Queensland for 80 years.

Locations

Australia
Event Cinemas have over sixty cinema venues around Australia, many of which are located in large shopping centres. The cinema complexes comprise multiple screens. The below locations do not include sites that operate under the joint venture between Village Roadshow and Event Hospitality & Entertainment known as Australian Theatres.

New South Wales

 Beverly Hills - trading as GU Filmhouse
 Blacktown - trading as Skyline Drive-In
 Bondi Junction
 Burwood
 Campbelltown 
 Castle Hill
 Coffs Harbour - trading as BCC Cinemas
 Cronulla - trading as GU Filmhouse (sold to Hoyts and rebranded). 
 Ed Square
 Glendale
 Hornsby 
 Hurstville
 Kotara
 
 Lismore
 Liverpool
 Macquarie 
 Miranda
 Parramatta
 Shellharbour - trading as Greater Union 
 Sydney CBD - colloquially known as George St
 Top Ryde City 
 Tuggerah
 Wollongong - trading as Greater Union - closed as of 2022. 

Northern Territory
 Casuarina - trading as BCC Cinemas
 Palmerston

Queensland

 Brisbane City
 Broadbeach - colloquially known as Pacific Fair 
 Browns Plains
 Cairns Central
 Cairns Earlville - trading as BCC Cinemas
 Cairns Smithfield
 Capalaba - trading as BCC Cinemas
 Carindale
 Chermside
 Coolangatta - trading as BCC Cinemas - Permanently Closed March 9th 2022
 Coomera
 Indooroopilly
 Ipswich - Traded As BCC Cinemas - Now Operated By Hoyts
 Kawana 
 Loganholme
 Mackay City - trading as BCC Cinemas - Permanently Closed December 19th 2019
 Mackay Mount Pleasant - trading as BCC Cinemas
 Maroochydore - trading as BCC Cinemas
 Mt Gravatt - colloquially known as Garden City

 Morayfield - trading as BCC Cinemas - Permanently Closed April 13 2022
 Noosa - trading as BCC Cinemas
 North Lakes
 Robina
 Rockhampton North - trading as BCC Cinemas
 Southport - colloquially known as Australia Fair
 Springfield 
 Strathpine - trading as BCC Cinemas
 Toombul - trading as BCC Cinemas
 Toowoomba - trading as BCC Cinemas Grand Central
 Toowoomba - trading as BCC Cinemas Toowoomba Strand 
 Townsville - trading as Event Cinemas Townsville Central
 Townsville - trading as Event Cinemas Townsville City

South Australia
 Adelaide - trading as GU Filmhouse – Permanent Closure announced October 2020
 Arndale - trading as Greater Union – Permanent Closure announced August 2020
 Glenelg - trading as GU Filmhouse 
 Marion

Victoria
 Russel Street - traded as Greater Union - Demolished in 2014

Western Australia
 Innaloo
 Morley - trading as Greater Union
 Whitford
 Joondalup - traded as Greater Union - Closed In 2004 and replaced by Grand Cinemas which was open until 2022
 Perth CBD - traded as Greater Union (Formerly CineCenter) - Permanently Closed In Mid 2000’S, Demolished In 2015, Now Appartments.

With cinema admissions in decline, Event Cinemas has continued to experience growth by raising the price of admissions and offering "premium experiences" such as "Gold Class" which offers more luxury seating and food, "Vmax" which offers a larger screen, and alternate content including Bollywood films, football, gaming, film festivals, opera and stand-up comedy events.

Fiji
Within Fiji, Damodar Event Cinemas is a joint venture between Village Cinemas, and the Fijian-based Damodar Brothers, who operate the existing two-cinema chain under licence since 2010. 
The brand has since changed its name to "Damodar Cinemas".

 Damodar City - trading as Damodar Event Cinemas

New Zealand
Event Cinemas operates cinemas in New Zealand's major urban centres, including the Embassy Theatre in Wellington. Hollywood blockbusters are regularly shown alongside arthouse features and film festivals such as the New Zealand International Film Festival.

 Albany 
 Auckland - colloquially known as Queen St
 Blenheim
 Broadway 
 Chartwell
 Coastlands
 Dunedin - trading as Rialto Cinemas 
 Havelock North
 Henderson - colloquially known as Westcity
 Manukau
 Mt Maunganui
 Newmarket - trading as Rialto Cinemas
 New Plymouth
 Palmerston North
 Sandringham - colloquially known as St Lukes
 Tauranga
 Tauranga Crossing
 Queensgate
 Wellington - trading as The Embassy
 Westgate
 Whangarei

Experiences

Gold Class
Gold Class cinemas, a luxury cinema format, is provided at a number of Event/BCC/Greater Union Cinemas locations in Australia, New Zealand & Fiji. Gold Class Cinemas include butlered refreshments, à la carte menu offerings and reclining seats in a cinema with a small number of seats. Village Cinemas first originated the concept of Gold Class, and has since popularised with the integration into the Event Group.

All Gold Class Cinemas are operated in separate areas within regular cinema complexes. Event/BCC/Greater Union Gold Class branded cinemas are located at:

In Australia:

 Bondi Junction
 Broadbeach - colloquially known as Pacific Fair 
 Campbelltown
 Carindale
 Castle Hill
 Chermside
 Coomera
 Mt Gravatt - colloquially known as Garden City
 Indooroopilly
 Innaloo
 Kawana
 Kotara
 Loganholme

 Macquarie
 Marion
 Miranda
 North Lakes
 Parramatta 
 Robina 
 Southport - colloquially known as Australia Fair
 Springfield
 Sydney CBD - colloquially known as George St
 Whitford

In Fiji:

 Damodar Event Cinemas

In New Zealand:

 Albany 
 Auckland - colloquially known as Queen St

V-Max
V-Max cinemas feature enhanced film display, picture quality, and immersive surround sound. The screens at V-Max used to be a minimum width of 25 meters or greater, however, that was lowered to 20 metres in 2010. V-Max cinemas are placed in large auditoriums which feature larger seats, stadium seating and wider arm-rests. Some locations also feature Dolby Atmos. The V-Max format is also provided at many Event Cinemas sites in Australia and New Zealand.

V-Max Cinemas are usually separate from the normal cinema complexes, like the Gold Class. There are certain locations that has Dolby Atmos surround sound included in their V-Max cinemas (brackets indicating). V-Max Cinema locations include:

In Australia: 

 Adelaide (Dolby Atmos) 
 Bondi Junction 
 Brisbane City Myer Centre 
 Browns Plains 
 Burwood 
 Cairns Central 
 Cairns Smithfield (Dolby Atmos) 
 Campbelltown 
 Carindale 
 Castle Hill 
 Chermside 
 Coomera (Dolby Atmos)
 Ed Square (Dolby Atmos)
 Garden City Mt Gravatt 
 George Street (Sydney CBD) (Dolby Atmos) 
 Glendale 
 Hornsby 
 Hurstville (Dolby Atmos) 
 Indooroopilly 

 Innaloo 
 Kawana (Dolby Atmos) 
 Kotara (Dolby Atmos) 
 Liverpool 
 Loganholme 
 Marion 
 Miranda (Dolby Atmos) 
 North Lakes (Dolby Atmos) 
 Pacific Fair (Dolby Atmos) 
 Palmerston (Dolby Atmos) 
 Parramatta 
 Robina 
 Springfield (Dolby Atmos) 
 Top Ryde City 
 Townsville City 
 Tuggerah 
 Whitford (Dolby Atmos) 

In New Zealand:

 Queensgate Shopping Centre (Dolby Atmos)
 Westfield St Lukes
 Westfield Manukau
 Westfield Albany
 Westfield Newmarket (Dolby Atmos)
 Tauranga Crossing (Dolby Atmos)

IMAX with Laser
IMAX with Laser uses precision lasers a sharper brighter images. This technology is currently available at Event Cinemas Auckland (Queen St) and Event Cinemas Queensgate (Wellington)

Digital 3D
GUO converted most of their Australian auditoriums and flagship cinemas to digital projectors. The installation of these projectors means that most auditoriums are now RealD Cinema 3D capable.

4DX
In late 2018, the first 4DX screen owned by the Event Group was opened in George Street (Sydney CBD). 4DX  stimulates all five senses, featuring moving seats and special effects including wind, fog, water and scents that synchronise with the action on screen.

Boutique
EVENT Boutique cinemas feature recliners with footrest, and in-cinema food-and-drink service. Guests have access to the Boutique Cinema 30 minutes prior to their session. Boutique is currently available at Event Cinemas George St (Sydney CBD).

Moonlight Cinema

Moonlight Cinema is an outdoor seasonal exhibitor that operates in most Australian metropolitan areas. Moonlight was acquired by EVENT in 2010 from Prime Media Group for $1.75million. The division continues to grow and has signed 3 new venue contracts since its acquisition, and currently operates in:

New South Wales
 Centennial Parklands, Sydney.
 Western Sydney Parklands, Sydney.

Queensland
 Roma Street Parkland, Brisbane.

South Australia
 Botanic Park, Adelaide.

Victoria
 Royal Botanic Gardens, Melbourne.

Western Australia
 Kings Park, Perth.

In addition, each venue offers 'Gold Grass' a luxurious outdoor-cinema experience, similar to the offerings of Event Cinemas' 'Gold Class'.

Cinebuzz Rewards
All cinema brands trading under EVENT, including Greater Union and BCC cinemas, share the benefits of the Cinebuzz Rewards Program. Free for members, the program grants access to advance screenings, ticket discounts, and one free movie ticket for every six movies viewed at EVENT. The program is aimed at encouraging brand loyalty and recognising VIP Customers and currently has over 3 million members in Australia.

Controversy 
The exhibition and production company that became Event Cinemas has been widely criticised as the cause of the downfall of early Australian film, which was argued to be the best in the world at the time.

In 2005, Event Cinemas banned people from bringing their own food and drink into the cinema. After negative public reaction and a threat of investigation by NSW Fair Trading, the company was forced to revoke the rule. People complained that Event Cinema's food was more than double the price of that in supermarkets and had less variety.

In 2012, Australian journalist Tim Burrowes attended a screening of Skyfall at an Event Cinema. There were various technical difficulties which resulted in the audience being asked to leave and a manager threatening Burrowes for filming the crowd's reactions.

In the lead up to the 2016 Australian Federal Election, Chairman Alan Rydge was reported to have donated to Prime Minister Malcolm Turnbull's controversial political fund the Wentworth Forum.

There have been numerous incidents of faulty popcorn machines causing fires to break out in Event Cinema complexes, including Top Ryde in 2011, Adelaide and Rockhampton in September 2015, Perth in December 2015, and Sydney in August 2016.

See also
Australian Theatres
Event Hospitality and Entertainment
Hoyts
The Movie Masters Cinema Group
Village Cinemas
Wallis Cinemas
Warner Village Cinemas
Cinema of Australia

References

External links
Event Cinemas Australia Official Site
Event Cinemas New Zealand Official Site
Event Hospitality & Entertainment Limited Official Site
Event Cinemas Australia Facebook
Event Cinemas Australia Twitter

Cinema chains in Australia
Cinemas in New Zealand
Entertainment companies established in 1913
1913 establishments in Australia